You're Welcome is the seventh studio album by American rock band A Day to Remember. It was released on March 5, 2021, and is the band's first release under major label Fueled by Ramen after spending six years as an independent band after leaving and the eventual lawsuit against former label Victory Records. The album is also the first new release by the band in five years, marking the longest gap between two albums in their entire career. The album's producers include Colin Brittain, vocalist Jeremy McKinnon, Mike Green, Will Putney, and Dan Book. It was preceded by five singles: "Degenerates", "Resentment", "Mindreader", "Brick Wall", and "Everything We Need". It is also the final album to feature founding bassist Josh Woodard before his departure in October 2021.

Composition
Musically, You're Welcome has been described as pop punk, pop, pop rock, metalcore, and post-hardcore. The album marks a significant departure from their metalcore/pop punk roots, with only a few songs falling within those genres as the album as a whole features more of a pop/pop rock sound. In an interview with NME, the band's vocalist Jeremy McKinnon went in-depth with the album's sound, describing it as a "happier" record.

In another interview with Kerrang!, McKinnon states that he wanted to take the "A Day to Remember sound" and "take on modern influences" with it. He also says that his love for the freedom and collaborative writing process found in EDM and rap resulted in the band getting together and throwing around ideas which resulted in the band demoing 42 songs. It got to the point to where some of the songs they wrote went from indie rock, to punk rock, to even "full tilt heavy". He would also talk about fan expectations and made it a goal to not stray too far from the band's core sound, with some songs ultimately being left out due to them wanting to push their sound in a way that "makes sense".

Release and promotion

On June 14, 2019, EDM producer Marshmello released a collaboration track with the band titled "Rescue Me", marking A Day to Remember's first new release in three years. On August 20, the band released the first single "Degenerates" alongside the announcement of the album as well as the band signing to Fueled by Ramen. It was eventually announced that the album would be released on November 15, 2019.

On November 8, during a show at the House of Vans in London, it was announced that the album has been delayed until early 2020. The band's guitarist Kevin Skaff later explained it was due to the album's mixing and artwork not being completed. A week after the album's original release date, the band released the single "Resentment". On April 15, 2020, the band released "Mindreader" alongside an animated music video. On November 18, one year after the album's original release date, the band released "Brick Wall" as well as revealing the album's artwork, tracklist, and release date for the album. On January 27, 2021, the album's fifth single, "Everything We Need" was released. On March 10, a music video was released for the album's fifth single "Everything We Need". On December 16, the band released a music video for the song "Last Chance to Dance (Bad Friend)".

Critical reception

NME called the album a "mish-mash of sounds and moany lyrics," and also stated that "there are more misses than hits here, as A Day To Remember struggle to work out who their band should be in 2021." Wall of Sound rated You're Welcome 5.5/10, feeling that the band changed their style simultaneously too drastically and quickly and likening it to Thirty Seconds to Mars' stylistic changes between A Beautiful Lie (2005) and This Is War (2009). He summarized that You're Welcome "..had so much potential for [the band] to deliver new sounds and styles that’d unite fans together. Unfortunately, it comes across like a forced, rush job..." Sam Law echoed these sentiments throughout his review for Kerrang!, remarking that the album was "slick but insubstantial".

In a more positive review, Riff Magazines Mike DeWald praised the album for its maturity and adaptability to many different styles, concluding that "those looking for only heavy guitar riffs and screaming aggression may want to look elsewhere, but those willing to take a musical journey will be rewarded."

Track listing

Personnel
Credits adapted from Tidal.

A Day to Remember
 Jeremy McKinnon – lead vocals, production
 Neil Westfall – rhythm guitar, backing vocals
 Josh Woodard – bass guitar
 Alex Shelnutt – drums
 Kevin Skaff – lead guitar, backing vocals

Additional musicians
 Aaron Brooks – additional guitar 

Additional personnel
 Colin Brittain – production , mixing 
 Mike Green – production 
 Will Putney – production 
 Dan Book – production 
 Drew Fulk – additional production 
 Josh Wilbur – mixing 
 Neal Avron – mixing 
 Tom Lord-Alge – mixing 
 Dan Lancaster – mixing 
 Alex Tumay – mixing 
 Mike Kalajian – mastering 
 Scott Skrzynski – additional editing, assistant mixing 
 Rhys May – assistant mixing

Charts

Weekly charts

Year-end charts

References

2021 albums
A Day to Remember albums
Albums produced by Colin Brittain